Azra Muranovic (born 1987) is a Swedish politician and member of the Riksdag, the national legislature. A member of the Social Democratic Party, she has represented Jönköping County since September 2022. She had previously been a member of the municipal council in Värnamo Municipality.

References

1987 births
Living people
Members of the Riksdag 2022–2026
Members of the Riksdag from the Social Democrats
People from Värnamo Municipality
Women members of the Riksdag
21st-century Swedish women politicians